Fujita Tameike is an earthfill dam located in Yamagata Prefecture in Japan. The dam is used for irrigation. The catchment area of the dam is  km2. The dam impounds about 3  ha of land when full and can store 163 thousand cubic meters of water. The construction of the dam was completed in 2003.

References

Dams in Yamagata Prefecture
2003 establishments in Japan